Cynanchum angustifolium is a plant species. Commonly known as the Gulf coast swallow-wort, it is a perennial dicot that grows in the southern United States as far west as Texas. It is in the Cynanchum genus and Apocynaceae family. A flowering vine, it produces white blossoms with greenish and yellow parts. A member of the milkweed family, it is a plant host for monarch butterflies and produces wind dispersed seed pods.

References

angustifolium
Flora of Texas